Jerrell Gavins (born October 24, 1988) is a former professional Canadian football defensive back for the Ottawa Redblacks of the Canadian Football League (CFL). He played college football at El Camino College and Boise State.

College career
Gavins played for El Camino College in 2008 and joined Boise State as a walk-on in 2009. Gavins had three interceptions in the first three games of the 2011 season, but he suffered a knee injury that forced him to miss the rest of the season. He was granted an injury hardship and returned for a fifth year in 2012. Gavins finished his Boise State career with six interceptions.

Professional career
After going undrafted in the 2013 NFL draft, Gavins received a tryout with the Tampa Bay Buccaneers. On May 30, 2013, Gavins signed with the Tampa Bay Storm.

Gavins signed with the Ottawa Redblacks in November 2013. On July 7, 2014, Gavins was fined $1,400, the CFL's maximum fine, for a hit on Winnipeg Blue Bombers quarterback Drew Willy. Gavins became the first Redblack to be fined for an on-field transgression. He admitted fault for the hit. Gavins played four seasons for the Ottawa Redblacks, winning the Grey Cup in 2016. He played in 59 games for the Redblacks during his CFL career, amassing 167 tackles, seven interceptions, three forced fumbles, and one quarterback sack. Gavins retired from professional football on February 27, 2019 at the age of 30.

References

External links
 Ottawa Redblacks profile

1988 births
Living people
American football defensive backs
American players of Canadian football
Boise State Broncos football players
Canadian football defensive backs
El Camino Warriors football players
Ottawa Redblacks players
Players of American football from Miami
South Miami Senior High School alumni
Tampa Bay Storm players
Players of Canadian football from Miami